Jonathan David DiSalvatore (born March 30, 1981) is an American former professional ice hockey player. He was selected by the San Jose Sharks in the 4th round (104th overall) of the 2000 NHL Entry Draft. DiSalvatore played five games in the National Hockey League with the St. Louis Blues during the 2005–06 NHL season and one game with the Minnesota Wild in the 2011–12 NHL season. On December 11, 2015 DiSalvatore played in his 800th American Hockey League game, putting him 2nd all-time in AHL games played for a U.S born player. On February 5, 2016 he played in his 900th professional game.

Playing career
As a youth, DiSalvatore played in the 1995 Quebec International Pee-Wee Hockey Tournament with a minor ice hockey team from Springfield, Massachusetts.

DiSalvatore was drafted in the 4th round, 104th overall, of the 2000 NHL Entry Draft by the San Jose Sharks from Providence College of the NCAA. After spending the 2003–04 season at the Sharks' affiliate, the Cleveland Barons, DiSalvatore was signed by the St. Louis Blues as a free agent on June 30, 2004. He was a key member of the Blues respective AHL affiliate. He played five games during the 2005–06 season for the Blues. On July 9, 2007, DiSalvatore was signed as a free agent by the Phoenix Coyotes. On July 16, 2009 DiSalvatore was signed along with Duncan Milroy to two-way contracts with the Minnesota Wild.

In the summer of 2008, he was signed by the New Jersey Devils and was assigned to affiliate the Lowell Devils.  DiSalvatore was named the AHL "Player of the Week" for the period ending November 23 after scoring 2 goals and 5 assists in 3 contests.

On July 2, 2012, the Hershey Bears announced they had signed the veteran DiSalvatore to a one-year AHL contract. In his single season as an alternate captain with the Bears in 2012–13, DiSalvatore played within a top 6 scoring role, producing 18 goals and 49 points in 68 games.

A free agent, DiSalvatore agreed to his first European contract on a one-year deal with German club, EHC München of the Deutsche Eishockey Liga, on July 22, 2013. In the 2013–14 season with EHC, DiSalvatore contributed with 17 points in 22 appearances before opting to return to North America mid-season to sign an AHL contract with the Syracuse Crunch on December 16, 2013.

On August 10, 2014, DiSalvatore re-joined EHC München on a one-year contract. In his second season with the club, DiSalvatore contributed with 13 goals and 34 points in 43 games before suffering a first round exit in the post-season.

As a free agent, DiSalvatore returned to North America and after going un-signed over the summer accepted a one-year ECHL contract with the Florida Everblades on October 29, 2015. After 12 games with the Everblades in the 2015–16 season, DiSalvatore agreed to a Professional Tryout Agreement (PTO) with the Springfield Falcons of the AHL on November 26, 2015. DiSalvatore was released from his PTO on January 19, 2016 & returned to the Florida Everblades.

Career statistics

Regular season and playoffs

International

Awards and achievements
 2001–02 HE Sportsmanship Award

References

External links
 
 

1981 births
Living people
American men's ice hockey right wingers
Cleveland Barons (2001–2006) players
Florida Everblades players
Hershey Bears players
Houston Aeros (1994–2013) players
Ice hockey players from Connecticut
Ice hockey people from Maine
Lowell Devils players
Minnesota Wild players
EHC München players
People from Windsor, Connecticut
Peoria Rivermen (AHL) players
St. Louis Blues players
San Antonio Rampage players
San Jose Sharks draft picks
Sportspeople from Bangor, Maine
Springfield Falcons players
Syracuse Crunch players
Worcester IceCats players